The Vignemale (Occitan: Vinhamala, Aragonese: Comachibosa, Catalan: Vinyamala), at 3,298 metres, is the highest of the French Pyrenean summits (the highest in the whole of the range is Pic d'Aneto). It lies on the border between the Department of Hautes-Pyrénées (Nauts Pirenèus / Hauts Pirenèus), in Occitanie and Gascony, France and Sobrarbe, in Huesca, Aragon, Spain, and the peak is split between the two countries.

The Vignemale is the name given to the mountain massif in French, which also straddles into Spain. It consists of several distinct summits, the predominant ones being Grand Vignemale or Pique-Longue (in French) / Pica Longa (in Occitan and Catalan) / Punda de Comabichosa (in Aragonese) (3298 m), Pointe Chausenque / Punta Chausenca (3,204 m) and Petit Vignemale / Petita Vinhamala (3,032 m). The Vignemale is also the site of the second largest of the Pyrenean glaciers (after the one on Aneto), the Ossoue / Osso (with around 0.6 km2), across which the "voie normale", or standard route to the summit travels.

One of its most dramatic aspects is the North Face upon which lie a number of serious ascent routes requiring skill and commitment. Below the North Face is the impressively situated mountain refuge - the Refuge des Oulettes de Gaube / Refugi d’eths Oletas de Gauba. The approach from the north entails a delightful walk up to and around the picturesque Lac de Gaube / Gauba giving increasingly dramatic views of the mountain.

Almost synonymous with the Vignemale is the name of Count Henry Russell, an eccentric of the Victorian era who developed a lifelong passion for the mountain.

The first documented, "official" ascent of this peak was by English landowner and traveller Anne Lister and three local guides in 1838.

Gallery

References

External links
 Count Henry Russell's caves on the Vignemale

Mountains of Hautes-Pyrénées
Mountains of Aragon
Mountains of the Pyrenees
Pyrenean three-thousanders
International mountains of Europe
France–Spain border
Highest points of French national parks